Baby is a 2000 made-for-television drama film starring Farrah Fawcett, Keith Carradine and an early performance from Alison Pill.

Plot
A baby is left on the doorsteps at the Malones' house. The baby is left with a note (from its mother) saying that she'll return when the time is right. The Malones take the baby in and care for its as if were their own.

Cast
 Farrah Fawcett as Lily Malone
 Keith Carradine as John Malone
 Jean Stapleton as Byrd 
 Alison Pill as Larkin Malone

References

External links
 

2000 television films
2000 films
2000 drama films
Films scored by Jeff Danna
Films directed by Robert Allan Ackerman
American drama television films
2000s American films